The 2015–16 Southern Miss Golden Eagles men's basketball team represented the University of Southern Mississippi during the 2015–16 NCAA Division I men's basketball season. The Golden Eagles, led by second year head coach Doc Sadler, played their home games at Reed Green Coliseum and were members of Conference USA. They finished the season 8–21, 5–13 in C-USA play to finish in a tie for 12th place.

Due to an ongoing NCAA investigation into NCAA violations and illegal benefits for players under former coach Donnie Tyndall, they self-imposed a postseason ban for the second consecutive year, which included the C-USA tournament.

Previous season
The Golden Eagles finished the 2014–15 season 9–20, 4–14 in C-USA play to finish in 13th place. Due to an ongoing NCAA investigation into illegal benefits for players under former coach Donnie Tyndall, the school self-imposed a postseason ban which included the C-USA tournament.

Departures

Incoming Transfers

Recruiting class of 2015

Roster

Schedule

|-
!colspan=9 style=| Exhibition

|-
!colspan=9 style=| Non-conference regular season

|-
!colspan=12 style=| Conference USA regular season

References

Southern Miss Golden Eagles basketball seasons
Southern Miss